Voraptipus is a monotypic genus of Mozambican nursery web spiders containing the single species, Voraptipus agilis. It was first described by Carl Friedrich Roewer in 1955, and is only found in Mozambique.

See also
 List of Pisauridae species

References

Endemic fauna of Mozambique
Monotypic Araneomorphae genera
Pisauridae
Spiders of Africa
Taxa named by Carl Friedrich Roewer